The 40th Flight Test Squadron is a United States Air Force unit.  It is assigned to the 96th Operations Group, based at Eglin Air Force Base, Florida.

History

"Combat in Southwest and Western Pacific, 2 June 1942 – 14 August 1945. Served in the occupation force in Japan, 1945–1950. Combat in Korea, 8 July 1950 – 25 May 1951. Air defense in Japan and Korea, June 1951 – June 1965. Trained cadres for transfer to Southeast Asia, 1966–1969. Not manned, 10 May 1969 – 15 October 1970 and 1 June 1972 – 30 April 1982."

Conducted test and evaluation missions, using the various aircraft, 1982–present.

In 2022, the squadron added the Kratos XQ-58A Valkyrie to its inventory.  This semi-autonomous unmanned aerial vehicle is capable of determining an optimal mission flight path 
based on inputs from ground stations or airborne fighter aircraft.  Testing will be led by the Autonomous Aircraft Experimentation Team.

Lineage
 40th Tactical Fighter Squadron
 Constituted as the 40th Pursuit Squadron (Interceptor) on 22 December 1939
 Activated on 1 February 1940
 Redesignated 40th Fighter Squadron on 15 May 1942
 Redesignated 40th Fighter Squadron, Single Engine on 20 August 1943
 Redesignated 40th Fighter-Interceptor Squadron on 20 January 1950
 Redesignated 40th Tactical Fighter Squadron on 20 June 1965
 Inactivated on 15 October 1970
 Activated on 1 October 1971
 Inactivated on 30 April 1982
 Consolidated with the 3247th Test Squadron on 1 October 1992 as the 40th Flight Test Squadron

 40th Flight Test Squadron
 Designated as the 3247th Test Squadron and activated on 25 June 1982
 Consolidated with the 40th Tactical Fighter Squadron as the 40th Test Squadron on 1 October 1992
 Redesignated 40th Flight Test Squadron on 15 March 1994

Assignments
 31st Pursuit Group, 1 February 1940
 35th Pursuit Group (later 35th Fighter Group, 35th Fighter-Interceptor Group), 15 January 1942 (attached to 35th Fighter-Interceptor Wing, 15 January–14 July 1954 and 8 October 1956 – 1 July 1957)
 41st Air Division, 1 October 1957 (attached to 3d Bombardment Wing, 1 December 1961 – 31 May 1962
 Tactical Air Command, c. 17 June 1965
 33d Tactical Fighter Wing, 20 June 1965 – 15 October 1970
 355th Tactical Fighter Wing, 1 October 1971 – 1 June 1972
 35th Tactical Fighter Wing, 1 June 1972 – 30 April 1982
 3246th Test Wing, 25 June 1982
 46th Test Wing, 1 October 1992
 46th Operations Group, 8 September 1993
 96th Operations Group, 1 October 2012 – present

Stations

 Selfridge Field, Michigan, 1 February 1940
 Baer Field, Indiana, 6 December 1941
 Port Angeles, Washington, 16 December 1941 – c. 22 January 1942
 Brisbane, Australia, 25 February 1942
 Ballarat Airport, Australia, 9 March 1942
 Mount Gambier Airport, Australia, 16 March 1942
 Townsville Airport, Australia, April 1942
 Berry Airfield (12 Mile Drome), New Guinea, 2 June 1942
 Townsville Airport, Australia, 30 July 1942
 Rogers Airfield (30 Mile Drome), New Guinea, c. 25 November 1942
 Tsili Tsili Airfield, New Guinea, 11 August 1943
 Nadzab Airfield, New Guinea, October 1943
 Gusap Airfield, New Guinea, 5 February 1944
 Nadzab Airfield, New Guinea, 9 June 1944
 Kornasoren Airfield Noemfoor, Schouten Islands, Netherlands East Indies, 4 August 1944
 Owi Airfield, Schouten Islands, Netherlands East Indies, 14 September 1944
 Wama Airfield, Morotai, Netherlands East Indies, 17 October 1944
 Mangaldan Airfield, Luzon, Philippines, 21 January 1945
 Lingayen Airfield, Luzon, Philippines, 11 April 1945

 Clark Field, Luzon, Philippines, 19 April 1945
 Yontan Airfield, Okinawa, Ryuku Islands, 30 June 1945
 Irumagawa Air Base, Japan, 10 October 1945
 Yokota Air Base, Japan, 13 March 1950
 Ashiya Air Base, Japan, 7 July 1950
 Pohang Air Base (K-3), South Korea, 17 July 1950
 Tsuiki Air Base, Japan, 13 August 1950
 Pohang AB (K-3), South Korea, 7 October 1950
 Yonpo Air Base (K-27), North Korea, 18 November 1950
 Pusan West Air Base (K-1), South Korea, 3 December 1950
 Misawa Air Base, Japan, 25 May 1951
 Johnson Air Base, Japan, 1 July 1951 (detachment at Komaki Air Base, Japan, 13 July 1953 – 17 February 1955)
 Yokota Air Base, Japan, 13 August 1954 – c. 15 June 1965
 Eglin Air Force Base, Florida, 20 June 1965 – 15 October 1970
 Davis–Monthan Air Force Base, Arizona, 1 October 1971
 George Air Force Base, California, 1 June 1972 – 30 April 1982
 Eglin Air Force Base, Florida, 25 June 1982 – present

Aircraft

 Bell P-39 Airacobra, 1941–1944
 Republic P-47 Thunderbolt, 1944–1945
 North American P-51 Mustang (later F-51, 1945–1950, 1950–1953
 Lockheed F-80 Shooting Star, 1950, 1953–1954
 North American F-86D Sabre, 1953–1961
 Convair F-102 Delta Dagger, 1960–1965
 McDonnell F-4 Phantom II 1965–1969, 1982–present
 LTV A-7 Corsair II, 1971–1972
 Fairchild Republic A-10 Thunderbolt II, 1982–present
 McDonnell Douglas F-15 Eagle, 1982–present
 General Dynamics F-16 Fighting Falcon, 1982–present
 General Dynamics F-111 Aardvark, 1982–1996
 Northrop T-38 Talon, 1982–present
 North American T-39 Sabreliner, 1982–unknown
 Lockheed C-130 Hercules, 1982–present
 Bell Boeing CV-22 Osprey, 1982–present
 Bell UH-1 Huey, 1982–present
 Boeing F-15EX Eagle II, 2021-present
 Kratos XQ-58A Valkyrie, 2022–present

See also
 United States Army Air Forces in Australia

References

Notes
 Explanatory notes

 Citations

Bibliography

  (subscription required for web access)
 
 
 

040